Zheng Shaoyu (1911–1942), also spelled Cheng Hsiao-yu (Wades-Gile), was born in Qu County of Sichuan province. In 1933–1934, he passed initial qualifications for admission into the China Central Aviation School at Jianqiao Airbase. He graduated top-3 in the class in 1935. When the War of Resistance/World War II broke out between China and the Empire of Japan following the 7/7 Incident, then-Lieutenant Zheng Shaoyu was attached to the 22nd PS, 4th PG at Zhoujiakou Airbase of the centralized Chinese Nationalist Air Force in anticipation of operations in the northern front.

Lt. Col. Zheng Shaoyu was the fourth commanding officer of the famed "Zhihang Fighter Group" (the 4th PG), after Capt Wang Tianxiang, Col. Gao Zhihang himself, and Capt. Li Guidan to die in the war against Imperial Japan.

Zheng Shaoyu was portrayed in the patriotic war drama Heroes of the Eastern Skies (1977).

References

Bibliography

 Cheung, Raymond. OSPREY AIRCRAFT OF THE ACES 126: Aces of the Republic of China Air Force. Oxford: Bloomsbury Publishing Plc, 2015. .
 徐 (Xú), 露梅 (Lùméi). 隕落 (Fallen): 682位空军英烈的生死档案 - 抗战空军英烈档案大解密 (A Decryption of 682 Air Force Heroes of The War of Resistance-WWII and Their Martyrdom). 东城区, 北京， 中国: 团结出版社, 2016. .

Republic of China Air Force personnel
Chinese aviators
Military personnel of the Republic of China killed in the Second Sino-Japanese War
Chinese World War II flying aces
1911 births
1942 deaths
Victims of aviation accidents or incidents in 1942